Jessica Steiger (born 24 May 1992) is a German swimmer. She competed in the women's 50 metre breaststroke event at the 2018 FINA World Swimming Championships (25 m), in Hangzhou, China.

References

1992 births
Living people
German female swimmers
German female breaststroke swimmers
Place of birth missing (living people)